Representative McIntosh may refer to:

David McIntosh (politician) (born 1958), American politician from Indiana
Robert J. McIntosh (1922–2008), American politician from Michigan